Rewley Road Swing Bridge is a disused railway swing bridge over Sheepwash Channel in west Oxford, England. To the north are Cripley Meadow and Fiddler's Island and to the south are Osney Island and the Botley Road.

The bridge was designed by Robert Stephenson and built in 1850–1. It was reconstructed in 1890 and 1906, latterly using steel girders. The bridge closed to passenger traffic in 1951 and to goods in 1984.

Overview
The swing bridge was for the former Buckinghamshire Railway line of London and North Western Railway that used to serve the Oxford Rewley Road railway station (later London, Midland and Scottish Railway, LMS), which was on the site of the Saïd Business School. It is close to Rewley Road Bridge to the east and Sheepwash Channel Railway Bridge to the west, which also cross Sheepwash Channel.

Restoration project
The bridge is one of two swing bridges in England that are scheduled monuments. In 2019, ownership passed from Network Rail to the Oxford Preservation Trust.

Gallery

References

Bridges completed in 1851
Railway bridges in Oxfordshire
Former railway bridges in the United Kingdom
Swing bridges in England
1851 establishments in England
1851 in rail transport
1984 disestablishments in England